Trey Dombroski (born March 13, 2001) is baseball pitcher in the Houston Astros organization. He played college baseball for the Monmouth Hawks. He attended Monmouth University to follow in his older brother Regan’s footsteps who was also a star pitcher for the hawks.

Amateur career
Dombroski grew up in Manasquan, New Jersey and attended Wall High School. He was named the NJ.com Pitcher of the Year as a senior.

Dombroski's freshman season was cut short by Covid-19. As a sophomore, he went 5-1 with a 2.73 ERA. After the season, Dombroski played for the Harwich Mariners of the Cape Cod Baseball League and was named the league Pitcher of the Year. As a junior, he was named the MAAC Pitcher of the Year.

Professional career
Dombroski was selected in the fourth round in the 2022 Major League Baseball draft by the Houston Astros. He signed with the Astros on July 23, 2022, and received a $443,900 signing bonus.

References

External links

Monmouth Hawks bio

2001 births
Living people
Baseball players from New Jersey
Baseball pitchers
Monmouth Hawks baseball players
People from Manasquan, New Jersey
Sportspeople from Monmouth County, New Jersey
Wall High School (New Jersey) alumni
Harwich Mariners players